Guillermo Eizaguirre Olmos (17 May 1909 – 25 October 1986) was a Spanish football goalkeeper and manager.

He was born in Seville and played for Sevilla FC from 1924 to 1936, and also had three caps for Spain from 1935 to 1936. He was later the manager of the Spain national football team from 1948 to 1956, and led the team in the 1950 FIFA World Cup.

He died in Madrid on 25 October 1986.

Honours
Sevilla FC
Spanish Cup: 1934–35

References

External links
 
 
 National team data 
 Guillermo Eizaguirre profile 

1909 births
1986 deaths
Footballers from Seville
Spanish footballers
Association football goalkeepers
La Liga players
Sevilla FC players
Spain B international footballers
Spain international footballers
Spanish football managers
Spain national football team managers
1950 FIFA World Cup managers